The 2005 European Amateur Team Championship took place 28 June – 2 July at Hillside Golf Club in Southport, England. It was the 24th men's golf European Amateur Team Championship.

Venue 

The club was founded in 1911. The course, located in Southport, 20 kilometres north of the city center of Liverpool, England, is a links course, with all the holes being between and on mainly large dunes and local indigenous pinewoods, typical of the area. It is physically close to both the Royal Birkdale Golf Club, near its south-western boundaries, and to the Southport and Ainsdale Golf Club.

Format 
Each team consisted of 6 players, playing two rounds of stroke-play over two days, counting the five best scores each day for each team.

The eight best teams formed flight A, in knock-out match-play over the next three days. The teams were seeded based on their positions after the stroke play. The first placed team were drawn to play the quarter final against the eight placed team, the second against the seventh, the third against the sixth and the fourth against the fifth. Teams were allowed to use six players during the team matches, selecting four of them in the two morning foursome games and five players in to the afternoon single games. Teams knocked out after the quarter finals played one foursome game and four single games in each of their remaining matches. Games all square at the 18th hole were declared halved, if the team match was already decided.

The eight teams placed 9–16 in the qualification stroke-play formed flight B, to play similar knock-out play, with one foursome game and four single games in each match, to decide their final positions.

The four teams placed 17–20 formed flight C, to play each other in a round-robin system, with one foursome game and four single games in each match, to decide their final positions.

Teams 
20 nation teams contested the event, the same nations as at the previous event two years earlier. Each team consisted of six players.

Winners 
Host nation and eight-time-winners team England won the opening 36-hole competition, with a 16-under-par score of 704, two strokes ahead of team Wales on 2nd place. Neither four-times-champions Ireland, with 16-year-old future professional major winner Rory McIlroy in the team, or two-times-champions Sweden did make it to the quarter finals, finishing tenth and eleventh respectively.

There was no official award for the lowest individual score, but individual leader was Edoardo Molinari, Italy, with a 6-under-par score of 138, one stroke ahead of Nigel Edwards, Wales, Julien Guerrier, France, Gary Lockerbie, England and Mike Lorenzo-Vera, France.

Team England won the gold medal, earning their ninth title and first since 1991, beating team Germany in the final 6–1. The winning English team included 45-year-old Gary Wolstenholme and 16-year-old Oliver Fisher.

Team Switzerland, for the first time on the podium, earned the bronze on third place, after beating France 5–2 in the bronze match.

Results 
Qualification round

Team standings

* Note: In the event of a tie the order was determined by the best total of the two non-counting scores of the two rounds.

Individual leaders

 Note: There was no official award for the lowest individual score.

Flight A

Bracket

Final games

Flight B

Bracket

Flight C

First round

Second round

Third round

Final standings

Source:

See also 
 European Golf Association – Organizer of European amateur golf championships
 Eisenhower Trophy – biennial world amateur team golf championship for men organized by the International Golf Federation.
 European Ladies' Team Championship – European amateur team golf championship for women organised by the European Golf Association.

References

External links 
 European Golf Association: Full results

European Amateur Team Championship
Golf tournaments in England
European Amateur Team Championship
European Amateur Team Championship
European Amateur Team Championship